Gomelo II (died 906x9) was the Bishop of Oviedo during the final years of the reign of Alfonso III of Asturias. He succeeded Hermenegild I probably about 892. Only one document from his episcopate survives, though it was interfered with at a later date by Pelagius of Oviedo. Dated 20 January 905, it is charter of the Cathedral of San Salvador signed by a bishop Gomellus along with the bishops Froilán of León, Sisenand of Iria, Nausto of Coimbra, and Reccared of Lugo. The charter ordered the construction of a castle beside the church in order to house relics—and refugees—during Viking attacks. The cathedral also received as gifts books, ornaments, villages, monasteries, churches, and rents of all kinds, but the jurisdiction over the church of Santa María de Lugo and the towns of Avilés and Gijón also given appear to be later (forged) additions. A 1612 copy of this diploma was mis-dated 1 February 925, but the list of bishops confirms the date of the copy in the cartulary of Oviedo.

According to a later falsified document of bishop Pelagius of Oviedo, Alfonso III held a council at Oviedo in 899 or 900 and with the approval of a certain "Pope John" (perhaps John VIII was intended) raised Oviedo to metropolitan rank. A document dated 20 January 905 in Pelagius's Liber testamentorum records a large donation made by the monarch to the see of Oviedo and confirmed by Gomelo II. This document is strongly suspect.

References
Barton, Simon and Richard A. Fletcher, edd. 2000. The World of El Cid: Chronicles of the Spanish Reconquest. Manchester: Manchester University Press, see p. 70. 
Canal Sánchez-Pagín, José María. 1993. "San Froilán, Obispo de León: Ensayo Biográfico," Hispania sacra, 45(91):113–146, see p. 126. 
Palomeque Torres, Antonio. 1948. "Episcopologio de la Sede de Oviedo durante el siglo X," Hispania sacra, 1(2):269–298, see pp. 274–75. 
Prado Reyero, Julio de. 1994. Siguiendo las huellas de San Froilán. Editorial San Esteban, see p. 95.

900s deaths
Bishops of Oviedo
Year of birth unknown